Gayil (also called Gayl, Gayi, Galila, Gelila, Northern Ari) is an Omotic language of Ethiopia. According to the 2007 census, 55,700 people speak Gayil as a mother tongue.

Bibliography
 Alemayehu Abebe (2002). "Sociolinguistic survey report on the Ometo dialect of Ethiopia, part II", SIL Electronic Survey Reports 2002-012.

References

Languages of Ethiopia
Aroid languages